The Juventud least gecko (Sphaerodactylus oliveri) is a species of lizard in the family Sphaerodactylidae. The species is endemic to the West Indies.

Etymology
The specific name, oliveri, is in honor of American herpetologist James Arthur Oliver.

Geographic range
S. oliveri is found in Cuba and the Bahamas.

Habitat

Reproduction
S. oliveri is oviparous.

References

Further reading
Grant C (1944). "New sphaerodactyls from Cuba and the Isle of Pines". Herpetologica 2: 118–125. (Sphaerodactylus oliveri, new species, p. 18).
Rösler H (2000). "Kommentierte Liste der rezent, subrezent und fossil bekannten Geckotaxa (Reptilia: Gekkonomorpha)". Gekkota 2: 28–153. (Sphaerodactylus oliveri, p. 113). (in German).
Schwartz A, Henderson RW (1991). Amphibians and Reptiles of the West Indies: Descriptions, Distributions, and Natural History. Gainesville, Florida: University of Florida Press. 720 pp. . (Sphaerodactylus oliveri, p. 518).
Schwartz A, Thomas R (1975). A Check-list of West Indian Amphibians and Reptiles. Carnegie Museum of Natural History Special Publication No. 1. Pittsburgh, Pennsylvania: Carnegie Museum of Natural History. 216 pp. (Sphaerodactylus oliveri, p. 159).

Sphaerodactylus
Reptiles of the Bahamas
Reptiles of Cuba
Reptiles described in 1944
Taxa named by Chapman Grant